The 8.8 cm SK C/32 was a German naval gun that was used in World War II.

Description
The 8.8 cm SK C/32 was a gun of modest performance with a shorter chamber which fired a shorter shell.  The SK C/32 had a loose one-part barrel with vertical sliding-block breech design.  It was designed to replace the older 8.8 cm SK L/45 naval guns on German light cruisers.  It is believed they replaced older 8.8 cm SK L/45 guns in twin Dopp LC/32 mounts on the Königsberg-class cruisers, Leipzig-class cruisers and were original equipment on the Spanish cruiser Navarra.  The SK C/32in variant of the gun had a loose two-part barrel with vertical sliding-block and was carried on a modified twin 10.5 cm Dopp LC/37 mounting and was intended for the unbuilt M Class light-cruisers.

Ammunition
Ammunition Types Available:
 High Explosive (HE) - 
 Illumination (ILLUM) -

See also
 List of naval guns

Footnotes

References

External links
 SK C/32 at Navweaps.com

88 mm artillery
Naval guns of Germany
Military equipment introduced in the 1930s